Sir Isaac Wolfson, 1st Baronet FRS (17 September 1897 – 20 June 1991) was a Scottish businessman and philanthropist. He was managing director of Great Universal Stores (G.U.S. or Gussies) 1932–1947 and chairman 1947–1987. He established the Wolfson Foundation to distribute most of his fortune to good causes. Great Universal Stores was a mail order business. He joined the company as a merchandising controller in 1932, becoming joint managing director in the same year. The company was in trouble when he joined but he turned it round and made it into a very strong business and the principal source of his wealth. He also had other successful business ventures. He was succeeded by his son Leonard Wolfson.

Early life
Isaac Wolfson was the son of a Jewish cabinet maker, Solomon Wolfson, an immigrant from Rajgród, Poland who settled in the Gorbals in Glasgow, Scotland. His mother was Nechi Surah Wilamowski.  He was educated at Queen's Park School, Glasgow.

He was highly capable in mathematics but could not afford to train as an accountant so he became a salesman for his father, who made cheap tables and chairs for local people. He is said to have been a brilliant salesman. At this time he made many business friends who worked with him ever afterwards.

In 1920 he left for London. There he started his own business, selling clocks, mirrors and upholstery. In 1926 he married Edith Specterman. His father-in-law owned a chain of suburban cinemas and helped him financially in his early days.

Great Universal Stores
In 1930 he was exhibiting at a trade fair in Manchester City Hall. George Rose was then a director of Great Universal Stores, only just renamed from mere Universal Stores. Rose liked Wolfson's display and ordered 500 clocks, which for Wolfson at the time was a big order. Rose took Wolfson to lunch and showed him the G.U.S. Devonshire Street factory. Soon Wolfson was G.U.S.'s chief buyer but he retained his own business and from G.U.S. took profit share and share options in lieu of salary.

Universal Stores was founded in 1900 by Abraham, George and Jack Rose. The company developed a mail-order trade, sending out small (by later standards) catalogues. In 1931, just after Wolfson joined, it went public but got into serious trouble and the shares plummeted. There were a number of reasons: financial inexperience, an ill-advised move from Manchester to London, a fire and the recession. These troubles hastened the death of Abraham, who was already a sick man.

Wolfson gradually acquired shares from the Rose brothers, using cash lent by his father-in-law and by Archibald Mitchelson, who was a friend. In 1932, he became joint Managing Director with George and in 1934 sole Managing Director. In his first eighteen months Wolfson streamlined and rationalised the company. A loss of £55,000 in 1932 became a profit of £330,000 the next year. From 1934 onwards Wolfson acquired companies with large hire purchase debts and property assets, some for G.U.S. and some for his own business. These acquisitions provided cash for more acquisitions. Acquired companies included Midland and Hackney, Drages, Alexander Sloan, Jays and Campbells, British and Colonial and Smart Brothers.

Wolfson was too old to go to war. As World War II approached and during the war he continued to buy. He reasoned that if Hitler won the war his businesses would be finished anyway, but, if not, then the opportunities would be enormous. In 1932, G.U.S. was worth £700,000, in 1938 £1,980,000 but by 1948 it was £16 million. This remarkable growth rate and aggressive acquisition plan was then succeeded by a gentler growth rate and a more corporate style.

By 1970, Wolfson had sold his private business and handed over control of G.U.S. to his son Leonard.

Other business interests
Wolfson was a brilliant financier and this was central to his early success. Later he backed French–British financier, tycoon, and politician James Goldsmith. He also underwrote the hire purchase agreements of washing machine entrepreneur John Bloom at Rolls Razor but withdrew financial support in 1964, leading to the company's voluntary liquidation.

In 1954 Wolfson was part of Kemsley-Winnick Television, which won the initial ITV weekend contracts for the Midlands and the North of England. However, shortly after the award of the contracts the consortium was shown not to have the financial backing required, causing it to collapse.

Religion and philanthropy
Wolfson was a devout orthodox Jew. He followed the example of his father and the middle-European community from which he came. He is quoted as having said, "No man should have more than £100,000. The rest should go to charity". He gave immense amounts to charities: from 1948 he included Zionist charities at the urging of his friend Israel Sieff. In 1962 he was appointed president of the United Synagogue, the first to be selected from descendants of the nineteenth century waves of immigrants.

In 1955, Wolfson established the Wolfson Foundation, to aid in the advancement of education, health and youth activities. This supported the establishment of Wolfson College, Oxford (where he was a Founder Fellow), Wolfson College, Cambridge, the Wolfson Building at Somerville College, Oxford, the Wolfson Building at Trinity College, Cambridge, and the Wolfson Room at St David's College, among many other projects over the years; he thus became the only non-religious figure to have a college named after him at both Oxford and Cambridge. Professorships named after him exist at Bar-Ilan, Haifa, Jerusalem, Oxford and Tel Aviv. He was also a benefactor of the John Rylands Library donating the cost of a small extension in 1961. The Edith and Isaac Wolfson Trust financed two housing projects in Israel, both called Kiryat Wolfson, and the family supported the founding of Wolfson Medical Center in Tel Aviv.

Wolfson is one of a handful of figures, including Edmund of Abingdon, Saint Peter, Saint Catherine,  Mary Magdalene, Mary, mother of Jesus, God and Jesus, to have both Cambridge and Oxford colleges named after them.

Personal life
Until 1960 Wolfson lived in Worcester; he then moved to London. He received a baronetcy in the Queen's 1962 New Year's Honours list, becoming Baronet as Sir Isaac Wolfson of St. Marylebone on 19 February 1962. He was elected a Fellow of the Royal Society in 1963 under Statute 12. In 1971, he was awarded the Freedom of the City of Glasgow. He died in Israel in 1991, aged 93.

Wolfson's wife, the former Edith Specterman, was a vice-president of the English Jewish Welfare Board.

Isaac and Edith Wolfson's only child, a son, Leonard, was born in 1927.

See also
 Wolfson family

References

External links
 Photographs in the National Portrait Gallery
 Website of the Edith Wolfson Medical Centre, Israel

1897 births
1991 deaths
Baronets in the Baronetage of the United Kingdom
British retail company founders
Scottish people of Polish-Jewish descent
Fellows of the Royal Society (Statute 12)
Jewish British philanthropists
People from Gorbals
Scottish Jews
Wolfson College, Cambridge
20th-century British philanthropists
People educated at Queen's Park Secondary School
People associated with Wolfson College, Oxford